San Pedro Jocopilas is a municipality in the Guatemalan department of El Quiché.

Notable residents
Rigoberta Menchú, Mayan human rights activist, and Nobel Peace Prize laureate

Municipalities of the Quiché Department